Yasuf is a Palestinian village located in the Salfit Governorate of the State of Palestine, in the northern West Bank, northeast of Salfit,  southwest of Nablus and adjacent to the Israeli settlement of Kfar Tapuach. According to the Palestinian Central Bureau of Statistics, it had a population of 1,621 in 2007. About 87% of the population relies on agriculture for income, while the remainder work in the public sector.

Location

History
NE and SW of the village is a large cemetery, with tombs carved into rock, some with arcosolia.

Potsherds from the Iron Age II (8th and 7th centuries BCE), have been found, and also from the Hellenistic/Roman, Crusader/Ayyubid, Mamluk and early Qttoman era. Byzantine ceramics have also been found.

Iron age 
Yasuf is identified with the Israelite village of Yaashuv mentioned in the Samaria Ostraca.

Classical antiquity 
During the Roman period, it was one of three important markets for fruits, grains and legumes in the northern Judean mountains, southern Samaria, and the region of Lod.

The village is mentioned by name in the Samaritan Book of Joshua, and in the 'Samaritan Chronicle', its ancient name is recorded as Jusepheh. In a Samaritan text, the town was known to be inhabited by Samaritan High Priests.

Middle ages 
During the Crusader period, Diya' al-Din (1173–1245) writes that there was a rural mosque in Yasuf, indicating that there was a significant Muslim population in the village at the time. He also noted that followers of Ibn Qudamah lived here.

Yakut (1179–1229) noted that Yasuf was a "village of Nabulus in the Filastin province. It is celebrated for its abundance of pomegranates."

Ottoman period
The village  was incorporated into the Ottoman Empire in 1517 with all of Palestine, and in 1596 it appeared in the  tax registers  under the name of Yasuf ar-Rumman. The villagers  paid taxes on wheat, barley, summer crops, olives,  goats and beehives; a total of 6,700 akçe. 1,5/24 of the revenue went to a Waqf.

French explorer Victor Guérin visited the village in 1870, and he found it to have about 350 inhabitants. The village appeared ancient, with old masonry reused in houses and walls. The village had an excellent supply of water which was collected in a pool, near the steps down was a beautifully carved niche with a shell motif. This pool provided water for  gardens of olive and pomegranate trees. In the 1882 PEF's Survey of Western Palestine (SWP),  Yasuf is described as, "an ancient village," located in a valley, with a Roman road passing nearby. Inside the village is "a good spring ... and olives. A beautiful garden of pomegranates exists north of the spring. The water comes out of a cleft in a cliff, near which is an ancient well with steps. There is a sacred place, with a large oak (Sindian), and a ruined shrine, south-west of the village, near 'Ain er Raja. There are drafted stones in many houses, and remains of well-built enclosures, now ruined. Many well-cut rock tombs are also found on either side."

Also in the village were, "rock-cut tombs with kokim [...]". A subterranean channel led out from the spring that contained small fish and there were pillar shafts there too. To the west of the village under an oak tree lay the ruins of a Maqam (shrine) for Sheikh Abu Hasan among the remains of other old drystone enclosures. To the north of the maqam was a rock-cut tomb, "with three loculi under arcosolia." Tombs also lay to the northeast and southwest with well-cut arched doors. In the valley to the northwest was a modern vault with a mihrab.

British Mandate period 
In the 1922 census of Palestine conducted  by the British Mandate authorities,  Yasuf had a population of 172, all Muslims, while in the 1931 census  it had 61 occupied houses and a population of  257, still all Muslim.

In  the 1945 statistics the population was 360, all Muslims, while the total land area was 6,068 dunams, according to an official land and population survey. Of  this,  928 were allocated  for plantations and irrigable land, 1,991  for cereals, while 35 dunams were classified as built-up areas.

Jordanian period 
In the wake of the 1948 Arab–Israeli War, and after the 1949 Armistice Agreements, Yasuf came  under Jordanian rule.

The Jordanian census of 1961 found 585 inhabitants here.

1967–present

Since the Six-Day War in 1967,  Yasuf  has been under  Israeli occupation.

After the 1995 accords, 25.5% of village land is defined as Area B land, while the remainder 74.5% is Area C. Israel has made numerous confiscations of village land, including confiscating 602 dunums for the establishment of the Israeli settlement of Kfar Tapuah.

On 11 December 2009, Yasuf's Al-Kabir Mosque was vandalized and burnt. Israeli police suspect the action was undertaken by Israeli settlers. Prayer carpets and holy books were destroyed in the fire, and the arsonists left behind graffiti reading, "We will burn all of you," and, "Prepare to pay the price." A few months previous radical settlers declared that Palestinians in the West Bank would pay a "price tag" every time Israeli forces dismantled illegal Israeli settlement structures. Following the incident, Israeli forces opened fire on 100 Palestinian residents of the village who were protesting the arson.

In January 2010, the extremist settler Rabbi Yitzhak Shapira was arrested by the Israeli police for alleged involvement in the torching of the mosque. He denied any involvement, and was later released due to lack of evidence.

In April 2010, the settlers spray-painted elsewhere in the village the words "Thank you God, for not making me a Gentile".

Israeli settler attacks
On October 6, 2014, Israeli settlers from Taffouh settlement ruined about 100 olive trees in Yasuf and 20 others in Burin, said Ghassan Daghlas, who is in charge of monitoring illegal settlers' activities in the area.

References

Bibliography

External links
Welcome To Yasuf
 Yasouf, IWPS
Yasuf, Welcome to Palestine
Survey of Western Palestine, Map 14:   IAA, Wikimedia commons 
 Yasuf Village (Fact Sheet), Applied Research Institute–Jerusalem (ARIJ)
 Yasuf Village Profile, ARIJ
 Yasuf aerial photo, ARIJ
 The Expansion of Tapuah settlement Established on the Land of Yasuf Village - Salfit Governorate, 01, July, 2000, POICA
 A New Colonial Outpost in Iskaka and Yasouf - Salfit, 15, October, 2011, POICA
Israeli Settlers Rage jammed on the villages of Iskaka and Yasouf  "Razing Palestinian lands for expanding Nofei Nehemia outpost ", 16, October, 2011, POICA
  Ravaging 78 Olive Trees in Jama'een and Yasouf villages – Salfit 14, January, 2012, POICA

Towns in Salfit Governorate
Municipalities of the State of Palestine
Ancient Samaritan settlements